Odorrana margaretae (common names: Margareta's frog, Margaret frog, green odorous frog) is a species of frog in the family Ranidae. It is found in southern and central China (Gansu, Guangxi, Sichuan, Hubei, Hunan, Guizhou, and southern Shaanxi provinces) and northern Vietnam (Lao Cai and Lai Chau provinces).

Odorrana margaretae inhabit fast-flowing hill streams and creeks surrounded by lush vegetation (both forest and fields). It is not considered threatened by the International Union for Conservation of Nature (IUCN).

References

margaretae
Amphibians described in 1950
Amphibians of China
Amphibians of Vietnam
Taxonomy articles created by Polbot